Gadari Kishore Kumar (born 16 December 1985) is an Indian politician from Telangana. He is currently representing Thungathurthi Assembly constituency. He belongs to Telangana Rashtra Samithi.

Early life
Gadari Kishore was born in Nalgonda in Nalgonda district, Telangana to Maraiah. He attended AP Residential School, Servail, Nalgonda from 1990-96. He did his Masters in Journalism and Mass Communication (MCJ) at Osmania University in 2006. He joined to pursue his doctorate in 2010 and received his doctorate in Journalism and Mass Communication in 2017.

He actively participated in Telangana movement as student leader at OUJAC, Osmania University. He is known for his oratorial skills.

Political career
He joined Telangana Rashtra Samithi in 2010 and contested from Thungathurthi in 2014 Telangana Assembly Elections & 2018 Telangana Elections and was elected as MLA by defeating opponents 2 times.

Personal life
He married on 27 August 2014, after becoming an MLA.

References

Living people
People from Telangana
Telangana politicians
Telangana Rashtra Samithi politicians
Telugu politicians
Telangana MLAs 2014–2018
1985 births
Telangana MLAs 2018–2023